Mpur (also known as Amberbaken, Kebar, Ekware, and Dekwambre), is a language isolate spoken in and around Mpur and Amberbaken Districts in Tambrauw Regency of the Bird's Head Peninsula, New Guinea. It is not closely related to any other language, and though Ross (2005) tentatively assigned it to the West Papuan languages, based on similarities in pronouns, Palmer (2018), Ethnologue, and Glottolog list it as a language isolate.

Locations
In Tambrauw Regency, ethnic Mpur people reside in Kebar District, Kebar Timur District, Manekar District, Amberbaken District, Mubrani District, and Senopi District. Villages include Akmuri, Nekori, Ibuanari, Atai, Anjai, Jandurau, Ajami, Inam, Senopi, Asiti, Wausin, and Afrawi.

Phonology

Consonants
Consonants in Mpur are:

Vowels
Mpur has five vowels: /a, e, i, o, u/.

Tones
Mpur has a complex tonal system with 4 lexical tones and an additional contour tone, a compound of two of the lexical tones. Its tonal system is somewhat similar to the nearby Austronesian languages of Mor and Ma'ya. The neighboring language isolate Abun is also tonal.

Mpur has four lexical tones. There is also a fifth complex contour tone formed as a phonetic compound of two lexical tones. An example minimal set is given below.

bé ‘but’ (high tone)
be ‘in’ (mid tone)
bè ‘fruit’ (low tone)

Vocabulary comparison
The following basic vocabulary words are from Miedema & Welling (1985), as cited in the Trans-New Guinea database:

{| class="wikitable sortable"
! gloss !! Mpur (Arfu dialect) !! Mpur (Kebar dialect)
|-
! head
| èbuam || èbuam
|-
! hair
| byambur || buambor
|-
! eye
| éyam || yam
|-
! tooth
| èbir || bir
|-
! leg
| pirik || èipèt
|-
! louse
| iːm || èyim
|-
! dog
| p(y)èr || pir
|-
! pig
| duao || duaw
|-
! bird
| iw (ip) || if
|-
! egg
| bua || bua
|-
! blood
| éfar || far
|-
! bone
| éip || ip
|-
! skin
| (è)fièk || fièk
|-
! tree
| perahu || perau
|-
! man
| dèmonip || mamir
|-
! sun
| put || put
|-
! water
| war || war
|-
! fire
| yit || yèt
|-
! stone
| biːt || bit
|-
! name
| muk || emuk
|-
! eat
| èryèt || barièt
|-
! one
| tu || tu
|-
! two
| dokir || dukir
|}

References

Further reading

External links 
 Materials on Karnai are included in the open access collections AC1 and CVL1 held by Paradisec.
 Audio and video recording are also available at the DoBeS archive.

West Papuan languages
Languages of western New Guinea
Language isolates of New Guinea
Tonal languages